Les Murakami (born June 1, 1936) is a former head coach of the Hawaii Rainbow Warriors baseball team. During his coaching years, he won  1,079 games. The Les Murakami Stadium, home field of the Rainbow Warriors, was named in his honor in 2002.

Awards

Hawaii Sportsman of the Year (1977, 1980) 
Lefty Gomez Award (1981) 
District Coach of the Year (1986) 
WAC Coach of the Year (1987, 1991) 
American Baseball Coaches Association Hall of Famer

Head coaching record
The following is a record of Murakami's record as a head coach.

References

1936 births
Living people
Hawaii Rainbow Warriors baseball coaches
Santa Clara Broncos baseball players
American sportspeople of Japanese descent
Hawaii people of Japanese descent
Baseball players from Honolulu